Peter Alfred Sutton (October 18, 1934 – September 5, 2015) was a Roman Catholic bishop.

Ordained to the priesthood in 1960, Sutton was named bishop of the Diocese of Labrador-Schefferville, Canada, in 1974. In 1986, Sutton was appointed coadjutor archbishop of the Roman Catholic Archdiocese of Keewatin-Le Pas and retired in 2006.

Notes

1934 births
2015 deaths
20th-century Roman Catholic archbishops in Canada
21st-century Roman Catholic archbishops in Canada
Roman Catholic archbishops of Keewatin–Le Pas
Roman Catholic bishops of Labrador City–Schefferville